The Showdown is a 1928 silent American drama film directed by Victor Schertzinger and starring Evelyn Brent. The film is preserved at the Library of Congress. In 2013 the Library of Congress print was shown at Capitolfest at Rome, New York.

Plot
A group of Westerners seek oil in Latin America, fighting over their claims and the local prostitute. When glamorous Sibyl (Brent) appears, "Lucky" Cardan (Bancroft) warns her that no woman can stay "decent" in "this country".

Cast
 George Bancroft as "Lucky" Cardan
 Evelyn Brent as Sibyl Shelton
 Neil Hamilton as Wilson Shelton
 Fred Kohler as Winter
 Helen Lynch as Goldie
 Arnold Kent as Hugh Pickerell
 Leslie Fenton as Kilgore Shelton
 George Kuwa as Willie

References

External links 

The Showdown at SilentEra

1928 films
1928 drama films
Silent American drama films
American silent feature films
American black-and-white films
Films directed by Victor Schertzinger
Surviving American silent films
1920s American films